Jariban District is a district in the north-central Mudug region of Somalia. Its capital is Jariban. The port city of Garacad is also located in this district.

References

External links
 Districts of Somalia
 Administrative map of Jariban District

Districts of Somalia

Mudug

Galmudug